Testament of Youth is the first instalment, covering 1900–1925, in the memoir of Vera Brittain (1893–1970). It  was published in 1933. Brittain's memoir continues with Testament of Experience, published in 1957, and encompassing the years 1925–1950. Between these two books comes Testament of Friendship (published in 1940), which is essentially a memoir of Brittain's close colleague and friend Winifred Holtby. A final segment of memoir, to be called Testament of Faith or Testament of Time, was planned by Brittain but remained unfinished at her death.

Testament of Youth has been acclaimed as a classic for its description of the impact of World War I on the lives of women and the middle-class civilian population of the United Kingdom. The book shows how the impact extended into the postwar years. It is also considered a classic in feminist literature for its depiction of a woman's pioneering struggle to forge an independent career in a society only grudgingly tolerant of educated women.

Narrative
In the foreword, Brittain describes how she originally intended to write of her experiences as a novel but was unable to achieve the necessary objective distance from her subject. She then tried to publish her original diary from the war years but with all names fictionalised. This too proved unworkable. Only then did she decide to write her own personal story, putting her experiences in the wider historic and social context. Several critics have noted the cathartic process by which she deals with her grief at the loss of young men close to her – her brother Edward Brittain, her fiancé Roland Leighton, and her friends Victor Richardson and Geoffrey Thurlow – in the writing.

The narrative begins with Vera's plans to enter Somerville College, Oxford, and her romance with Roland Leighton, a friend of her brother Edward. Both were commissioned as officers early in World War I, and both were subsequently killed, as were several other members of their social circle.

The book's main subject is Vera's work as a Voluntary Aid Detachment nurse, nursing wounded soldiers in London, Malta and at Etaples in France. It also describes how she returned, disillusioned, to Somerville College after the war and completed her BA degree. It covers the beginning of her career in journalism, writing for Time and Tide and lecturing for the League of Nations. She visits the graves of her brother Edward in Italy and her fiancé Roland in France. Together with Winifred Holtby she toured the defeated and occupied regions of Germany and Austria in 1923.

It concludes with her meeting her husband George Catlin and their eventual marriage in 1925.

Publishing history
 First published Victor Gollancz (28 August 1933)
 Victor Gollancz, London (1940)
 Grey Arrow paperback, Arrow Books, London (1960)
 Wideview Books (1970) 
 Virago Press (1973) 
 Fontana (1979) 
 Seaview Books (1980) B010174; 661
 Penguin Group (United States) (1980) 
 Putnam Pub Group (1980) 
 Penguin Classics (2005) 
 Publisher: Virago Press Ltd (2004) 
 Publisher: Weidenfeld & Nicolson (2009)

Publication of source materials
Between 1922 and 1924, Brittain had attempted to edit her war diaries for publication in response to a publisher's competition; however, when they were not selected, she focused for a time on fiction and journalism before ultimately adapting them into her memoir in 1933. The diaries on which the book is partly based were edited by Alan Bishop and published as Chronicle of Youth in 1981. In 1998, the war letters which Brittain also drew on in her autobiography were published in an edition by Alan Bishop and Mark Bostridge. Entitled Letters from a Lost Generation, their appearance was met with considerable acclaim.

Adaptations
The book was dramatised by Elaine Morgan as a five-part serial which was transmitted on BBC2 in 1979. This version features Cheryl Campbell as Vera Brittain, Peter Woodward as Roland Leighton, Joanna McCallum as Winifred Holtby and Emrys James and Jane Wenham as Vera's parents.

In 1998, to commemorate the eightieth anniversary of the Armistice, a fifteen-part radio dramatisation of the letters on which Testament of Youth was partly based was broadcast on BBC Radio Four. Entitled Letters from a Lost Generation, it was dramatised by Mark Bostridge and starred Amanda Root as Vera Brittain and Rupert Graves as Roland Leighton.

In 2009 it was announced that the feature film Testament of Youth was in development by BBC Films and Heyday Films producer David Heyman, and was to be directed by James Kent. This had the support of the Vera Brittain Estate, Brittain's daughter Shirley Williams, and Brittain's biographer Mark Bostridge who is acting as consultant. Saoirse Ronan was cast to play Brittain in 2012 but was replaced in December 2013 when it was announced that Alicia Vikander would play Vera Brittain in the film which was released in late 2014 as part of the First World War commemorations. On 4 February 2014 Kit Harington joined the cast to play the role of Brittain's fiancé Roland Leighton. On 13 February 2014, Colin Morgan, Taron Egerton, and Alexandra Roach were announced to have joined the film's cast. An ensemble cast was later confirmed as filming began, including Dominic West, Emily Watson, Joanna Scanlan, Hayley Atwell, Jonathan Bailey and Anna Chancellor. It substituted Merton College, Oxford in the scenes showing Brittain's time as a student at Somerville College, arguing that filming in Somerville itself would have been too difficult in light of the new buildings constructed there since the film's time period.

Criticism
A book by Brittain's biographer and editor Mark Bostridge, entitled Vera Brittain and the First World War: The Story of Testament of Youth was published by Bloomsbury in December 2014. It looks at early versions of the book in the wake of the new film adaptation.

See also
 Anti-war movement
 Feminism in the United Kingdom
 Opposition to World War I

Other sources
 The making of a peacenik  Mark Bostridge, The Guardian 30 August 2003. Brittain's biographer reviews Testament of Youth. Accessed May 2008
Testament of Youth, Vera Brittain's Literary Quest for Peace By Linda S. Coleman Popular Press (1997). Accessed June 2008
Mourning through Memoir: Trauma, Testimony, and Community in Vera Brittain's Testament of Youth. by Richard Badenhausen in Twentieth Century Literature, Vol. 49, 2003. Extract accessed June 2008

References

External links

 Where did Vera Brittain serve in France during the First World War? at Simon Jones.

 
1933 non-fiction books
Anti-war books
Autobiographies adapted into films
British autobiographies
History books about World War I
Macmillan Publishers books
Personal accounts of World War I
Victor Gollancz Ltd books